= Old Fitzhugh, Virginia =

Unincorporated community in Virginia, US

Coordinates: 36°41′11″N 77°45′11″W

Old Fitzhugh is an unincorporated community located in Brunswick County, in the U.S. state of Virginia.
